Human & Experimental Toxicology is a peer-reviewed medical journal covering the field of toxicology. It was established in 1981 as Human Toxicology and obtained its current name in 1990. It is published by SAGE Publications and the editor-in-chief is Kai Savolainen (Finnish Institute of Occupational Health).

Abstracting and indexing 
The journal is abstracted and indexed in Current Contents, Scopus, and the Science Citation Index Expanded. According to the Journal Citation Reports, its 2018 impact factor is 2.171, ranking it 64th out of 87 journals in the category "Toxicology".

References

External links 
 

English-language journals
Monthly journals
Publications established in 1981
SAGE Publishing academic journals
Toxicology journals